VK Dukla Liberec is a Czech volleyball club based in Liberec.

The club was born in 1948 in Prague, and in its history changed its headquarters several times: in 1957 it moved from the Czechoslovak capital to the town of Kolín, in 1966 to Jihlava, and finally in 1969 settled permanently in Liberec.

The words Dukla is the amount of Czech CSKA, in fact represented the formation, in the years of Soviet control, the army of Czechoslovakia. Several athletes formed in the club became professional soldiers. Currently, after the reform of the army of the Czech Republic, the team is no longer made up of soldiers.

Dukla boasts the victory of 17 championships and nine national Cups, but the most important result is the CEV European Champions Cup won in 1976. The final result of continental importance is the third place in the 2005 edition of the CEV Cup.

Honours

Domestic
 Czech Championship
Winners (4): 2000–01, 2002–03, 2014–15, 2015–16

 Czech Cup
Winners (10): 1994–95, 2000–01, 2006–07, 2007–08, 2008–09, 2012–13, 2013–14, 2015–16, 2017–18, 2020–21

 Czechoslovak Championship
Winners (14): 1949–50, 1950–51, 1951–52, 1952–53, 1953–54, 1954–55, 1959–60, 1960–61, 1962–63, 1972–73, 1974–75, 1975–76, 1979–80, 1982–83

 Czechoslovak Cup
Winners (2): 1974–75, 1991–92

International
 CEV European Champions Cup 
Winners (1): 1975–76

Former names

References

External links
 Official website 
 Team profile at Volleybox.net

Czech volleyball clubs
Sport in Liberec
Volleyball clubs established in 1948
1948 establishments in Czechoslovakia